Kathryn is a given name.

Kathryn may also refer to:

 Kathryn (album), a 2014 album by Kathryn Bernardo
 Kathryn, North Dakota, a city in Barnes County, North Dakota, United States
 Kathryn (skipjack), a Chesapeake Bay boat built in 1901
 Kathryn Spirit, an open-hatch bulk carrier built in 1967

See also
 Lake Kathryn (disambiguation)
 Catherine (disambiguation)
 Katherine (disambiguation)
 Kathryn Tucker Windham Museum, a biographical museum in Thomasville, Alabama, United States